The Heinkel Kabine was a microcar designed by Heinkel Flugzeugwerke and built by them from 1956 to 1958.  Production was transferred under licence to Dundalk Engineering Company in Ireland in 1958. However, the licence was withdrawn shortly afterwards due to poor quality control. Production restarted in 1960, again under licence, under the Trojan 200 name by Trojan Cars Ltd. in the UK, and continued until 1966.

Heinkel Kabines were also assembled under licence by Los Cedros S.A. from 1959 until 1962. As Heinkel in Argentina, they were built alongside Studebaker pickups.

The Kabine Model 150 used the 174 cc 9.2 hp single-cylinder four-stroke engine that powered the Heinkel Tourist scooter. In October 1956, Heinkel introduced the Kabine Model 153 (with three wheels) and the Kabine Model 154 (with four wheels), both with 204 cc engines. The engines in these models were later reduced in capacity to 198 cc for insurance purposes.

The Kabine had a steel unit body. Access to the interior was by an opening front. In order not to infringe Iso Rivolta's patent used on the Isetta, the steering wheel did not hinge outwards with the door to ease passenger access. However, it did feature a reverse gear, unlike some other bubble cars.  The fabric sun roof served as an emergency escape hatch should the sole door in front become jammed in a collision.

The Kabine featured prominently in the 1959 film I'm All Right Jack and the 1961 film Murder in Eden, and was briefly featured in the 1957 films Blue Murder at St Trinian's and The Naked  Truth (aka Your Past Is Showing).

"Kabine" is the German word for "cabin".

Specifications

See also 
 Isetta
 List of microcars

References 

H
Heinkel
Three-wheeled motor vehicles
Cars introduced in 1956
Cars of Ireland